Lawrence Sidney Mithen (15 April 1934 – 2 February 2022) was an Australian rules footballer who played for Melbourne in the VFL during their successful period in the late 1950s under Norm Smith.

Education
He was awarded a Bachelor of Arts from the University of Melbourne in April 1964.

Ormond (VAFA)
Playing for the Ormond Amateur Football Club in the Victorian Amateur Football Association, Mithen was the Association's best and fairest A Grade player in 1953.

Melbourne (VFL)
Recruited from Ormond, he played in three consecutive premierships from 1955 to 1957 and was a premiership player again in 1959 and 1960 to finish with five.

Mithen played as a half forward early in his career before moving into the centre. It was as a centreman that he had most success, winning Melbourne's best and fairest in 1958 and 1959.

VFL representative
He was selected to play for Victoria in the 1958 ANFC Melbourne Carnival. In the only match (of a possible four) that he played in — the 7 July 1958 match against the VFA — he was completely outclassed by the VFA centreman, Bob Withers.

Team of the Century
He was named on the interchange bench in the Melbourne's official 'Team of the Century'.

Port Melbourne (VFA)
In 1963, he moved to the Port Melbourne Football Club in the VFA and was the team's captain-coach from 1963 to 1965, during which time, he played 52 games, and the club won the 1964 Premiership.

Claremont (WAFL)
He played for Claremont Football Club in the WAFL in 1966 and 1967 for a total of 34 games.

Death
On 4 February 2022, it was announced that Mithen had died, at the age of 87.

Footnotes

External links
 
 Laurie Mithen's playing statistics from The VFA Project
 Laurie Mithen's playing statistics from WAFL Footy Facts
 Boyles Football Photos: Laurie Mithen
 Laurie Mithen, demonwiki.com

1934 births
2022 deaths
Australian rules footballers from Victoria (Australia)
Melbourne Football Club players
Port Melbourne Football Club players
Claremont Football Club players
Port Melbourne Football Club coaches
Keith 'Bluey' Truscott Trophy winners
Ormond Amateur Football Club players
Five-time VFL/AFL Premiership players
Melbourne Football Club Premiership players